Pella is a small town in the Pella (municipality)  in the Pella regional unit of Macedonia, Greece. Pella is built on a hill at a distance of one kilometre from the road Thessaloniki - Edessa, and the archeological site Pella and 7 km from Giannitsa. Pella has an area of about 3 km2 and a population of 2450 inhabitants.

History 
It is located on the site of ancient Pella, the capital of the Kingdom of Macedonia and birthplace of Alexander The Great. Ancient Pella was a vast city. However, the city was ravaged by the Romans during the 1st Century BC and lost its significance. During the Byzantine and Ottoman periods, the town was known in Greek as Άγιοι Απόστολοι (Agii Apostoli) 'Holy Apostles' and in Ottoman Turkish as Allah Kilise 'God's Church'. In the local Slavic language, the name is Postol (Постол). The name Pella was revived in 1926. By the 19th century, Agii Apostoli occupied a site near the upper city, and the lower city extended down to the wetlands of Mavroneri. Félix de Beaujour, a French consul of Thessaloniki at the end of the 18th century, wrote in his travels for the Ottoman Empire: "Pella rises amphitheatrically on the slope of a hill on the top of which was the fortress, at the present is a little village of Alla Klise, populated with Bulgarians." The village joined the Bulgarian Exarchate and a survey by Vasil Kanchov in 1900 revealed that the population of Pella was 520 Bulgarian Exarchists. Another survey in 1905 recorded that in the village there were 720 Bulgarian Exarchists. During the exchange of populations with the Treaty of Lausanne  (July 24, 1923) refugees from Eastern Thrace in modern Turkey. Refugees from Bulgaria arrived in 1918 -1924. Finally, about 50 Sarakatsani families came to the village in 1947, coming from the areas of Florina. Many of its inhabitants emigrated to Bulgaria at that time.

Notable People born in Pella (modern town)
 Aleksa Mindov, activist of the Thessaloniki Bulgarian club
 Andon Traykov, soldier in the Macedonian-Adrianopolitan Volunteer Corps
 Krste Misirkov, (1874 - 1926),  philologist, journalist, historian and ethnographer
 Theodora Tzakri, Member of Parliament of Greece
 Yordana Slatinkova (1924 – 1948), female communist fighter in the Greek Civil War
Anastasios (Tasos) Kakamanoudis, (1985-present), Greek archeologist

References

Populated places in Pella (regional unit)